The 2020 Canon O'Brien Cup was a hurling game played to determine the champion of the Canon O'Brien Cup for the 2020 season. University College Cork defeated the Cork senior hurling team by 2-18 to 1-20. The game was played on 7 January 2020 in the Mardyke, Cork. This was the seventh staging of Canon O'Brien Cup since 2013.

Match

Details

References

External links
 Official Cork GAA website

2020 in hurling